Walker Hall, originally known as the Mechanical Engineering Building, is an historic classroom building on the campus of the University of Florida in Gainesville, Florida, in the United States. It was designed by Rudolph Weaver in the Collegiate Gothic style and was built in 1927 It was later named for Col. Edgar S. Walker, a civil engineering professor.

Walker Hall is a contributing property in the University of Florida Campus Historic District which was added to the National Register of Historic Places on April 20, 1989.

See also 
 University of Florida
 Buildings at the University of Florida
 Campus Historic District

References

External links 

  UF Historic Sites Guide: Walker Hall

Category:University and college buildings on the National Register of Historic Places in Florida

Rudolph Weaver buildings
Buildings at the University of Florida
Guy Fulton buildings
Historic district contributing properties in Florida
National Register of Historic Places in Gainesville, Florida
University and college buildings completed in 1927
1927 establishments in Florida